Hawley is a borough on the Lackawaxen River in Wayne County, Pennsylvania, United States. The borough's population was 1,229 at the time of the 2020 United States Census.

History 
The borough was named for Irad Hawley, first president of the Pennsylvania Coal Company. Early industry centered on the transportation and support of nearby coal mining operations along with manufacturing facilities. The Bellemonte Silk Mill, regarded as the largest bluestone building in the world, and J.S. O'Connor American Rich Cut Glassware Factory are listed on the National Register of Historic Places.

Attractions and recreation
Hawley is home to a number of notable lakes, golf courses, and other recreational facilities, making it a leisure destination, particularly during the summer months.  Local attractions include:
Costa's Family Fun Park - a place for miniature golf, batting cages, go-karts, bumper boats, and arcade games
Lake Wallenpaupack - a 13-mile long lake with 52 miles of shoreline
The Lodge at Woodloch - a luxury spa
Woodloch Pines & Woodloch Springs - a resort and golf course
The Hawley Silk Mill - the Bellemonte historical silk mill renovated by Peter Bohlin now features shops, boutiques, a gym, a spa, offices and a college.
The Ritz Theater - a community theater offering musicals and strait shows during the summer months and holidays.
Strike it Rich Pro Shop - Bowling pro shop located in the Wallenpaupack Bowling Center
Hotel Belvidere - Historical Hotel since 1902
Ledges Hotel 119 Falls Ave - Boutique Hotel with Small Plate Dining
Lukan's Farm Resort - Family Style Breakfast and Dinner. Heated Pool. Lodging in pool side room or deluxe rooms.

Geography
Hawley students attend Wallenpaupack Areas Schools, with high, middle, and primary schools approximately five miles from town and located on the shores of Lake Wallenpaupack. Some kindergarten children attended school in the former Hawley High School, a WPA project and located in the borough, up until a few years ago when they were transferred back to the primary school.

Demographics

As of the census of 2010, there were 1,211 people, 549 households, and 297 families residing in the borough. There were 625 housing units. The racial makeup of the borough was 96.4% White, 0.5% African American, 0.1% Asian, 0.9% from other races, and 2.1% from two or more races. Hispanic or Latino of any race were 5% of the population.

There were 549 households, out of which 23.5% had children under the age of 18 living with them, 32.8% were married couples living together, 15.5% had a female householder with no husband present, and 45.9% were non-families. 39.7% of all households were made up of individuals, and 18.2% had someone living alone who was 65 years of age or older. The average household size was 2.21 and the average family size was 2.97.

In the borough the population was spread out, with 22.5% under the age of 18, 60.2% from 18 to 64, and 17.3% who were 65 years of age or older. The median age was 44.4 years.

The median income for a household in the borough was $22,404, and the median income for a family was $33,462. Males had a median income of $25,357 versus $20,357 for females. The per capita income for the borough was $16,093. About 18.9% of families and 20.7% of the population were below the poverty line, including 29.1% of those under age 18 and 17.1% of those age 65 or over.

Notable people

 Homer Bigart, two-time Pulitzer Prize winning reporter
 John J. Boyle, 19th Public Printer of the United States (attended Hawley High School)
 Charlie Gelbert, football player; member of the College Football Hall of Fame
 Michael John Hoban, prelate of the Roman Catholic Church
 Robert Koenig, film director, producer, and writer
 James W. McAndrew, U.S. Army major general
 Rick Schmidlin, film producer
 Norman Welton, Associated Press journalist/photo editor

References

External links
 Visit Hawley website

Boroughs in Wayne County, Pennsylvania
Pocono Mountains
Populated places established in 1803
1827 establishments in Pennsylvania
Pennsylvania populated places on the Delaware River